Nightmare Factory is a 2011 documentary film directed by Donna Davies about KNB EFX Group, a special effects company.

Premise 
Donna Davies profiles KNB EFX Group, a special effects company that specializes in practical effects.

Interviews 

 George A. Romero
 Quentin Tarantino
 Robert Rodriguez
 Elijah Wood
 John Carpenter
 John Landis
 Frank Darabont
 Simon Pegg
 Greg Nicotero
 Howard Berger
 Robert Kirkman
 Norman Reedus
 Laurie Holden
 Cerina Vincent
 Tom Savini

Release 
Nightmare Factory premiered on The Movie Network on October 27, 2011.  Epix aired it on American television on October 30, 2013.

Reception 
Drew Taylor of IndieWire rated it a letter grade of A− and called it "mostly a hoot", though he criticized the interviews with Tarantino and Rodriguez as probably coming from DVD extras.  Brad McHargue of Dread Central rated it 4/5 stars and wrote that although it is occasionally amateurish and jumbled, the documentary is insightful about the role of special effects in filmmaking.  James Marsh of Screen Anarchy called it "exhaustive to the point of being exhausting", comparing it to a very long DVD extra.

References

External links 
 
 Donna Davies IMDB https://www.imdb.com/name/nm1013354/
 Ruby Tree Films https://www.rubytreefilms.com

2011 television films
2011 films
2011 documentary films
Canadian documentary television films
Documentary films about the film industry
2010s Canadian films